Sonic Studio is an American company manufacturing digital audio production tools for engineering professionals. The company was created when Sonic Solutions divested itself of its audio product lines in order to concentrate on DVD and multimedia–oriented products.

History

Overview 

Under the auspices of Sonic Solutions, the Sonic Studio audio workstation has driven the professional production and delivery of commercial Compact Discs. The original “Sonic System” pioneered the desktop delivery of Red Book masters on recordable CD, in the same way that the original Macintosh and LaserWriter spawned the desktop publishing revolution. Prior to the introduction of the Sonic System, Compact Disc were assembled and premastered using bulky, expensive and unreliable U-matic videotape–based systems.

Early years 

The Sonic System began life as research into real–time, computer–based audio production. The Audio Signal Processor (or ASP) hardware–based audio signal processor, designed by James A. Moorer, after work on the Hydra audio project at Stanford University’s CCRMA, was a proof of concept for what is now considered a digital audio workstation. The ASP's design started life in 1980 and was designed primarily for real–time, multichannel EQ and mixing. SoundDroid, an in–house project of Lucasfilm Ltd.’s Sprocket Systems that was later spun off as part of The Droid Works, was a hard disk–based, non–linear, second generation digital audio workstation that leveraged the research done on the ASP. Though the SoundDroid project was never commercialized and The Droid Works was later sold to Avid, the audio development team went on to first create the NoNOISE restoration system in 1987, hosted on a Motorola–powered SUN 1, the first true, general purpose computer “workstation,” which had been developed in cooperation with Lucasfilm. The SUN ran UNIX, developed by Bell Labs and refined at UC Berkeley. Sonic Studio’s current flagship product run on Mac OS, a modern version of that same UNIX variant, BSD Unix, that powered the original SUN workstation.

After evaluating the cost and complexity of their SUNs, the Sonic team decided to tap a new platform, Apple Computer’s Macintosh II, also powered by a Motorola 68000, to create the first production version of the Sonic Station later that year. By 1988, the Sonic Station was in service at EMI Abbey Road and Finesplice in London, and MCA in California, performing “miraculous” feats of restoration and starting a trend of mining back catalog that continues to this day. That first system employed a dedicated NuBus hardware co–processor, with 4 Motorola 56000–series Digital Signal Processors (DSP), beginning a trend that continued through seven generations of hardware.

Demand grew for a turnkey Compact Disc preparation system and, in 1990 with the addition of the world’s first CD-R product, Sony’s $30,000, two piece, E-1/W-1 Compact Disc-Recordable system in conjunction with START Lab’s new media, the complete Sonic System was born. After a few years of development, the product was renamed “SonicStudio” and development continues to this day.

Present day 

In 2002, Sonic Solutions decided to divest themselves of their original audio product line. To concentrate solely on the DVD content creation market, they formed a joint venture and, in 2004, that business was transferred to Big Endian, LLC to carry on the development, sales, and support of Sonic Solutions’ audio workstation products.

Based in San Anselmo California, Sonic Studio, LLC continues to manufacture products that address the needs of the world’s most discriminating audio professionals with powerful PCM and DSD origination, editing and processing capabilities, and integrated premastering for both CD, SACD and rich media distribution. Sonic Studio’s NoNOISE noise and distortion reduction tools and streamlined workflow have allowed the product lines to remain at the forefront of restoration for DVD post–production and archival re–release.

Pioneering work 

Over the years, development of the product lines have resulted in many breakthroughs now considered commonplace in the professional audio community. Some of the features and technologies brought to the pro audio market by Sonic Studio’s forbearers include:

 graphical digital waveform displays
 24 bit AES digital I/O
 SDIF-2 digital I/O
 4–point editing model, borrowed from videotape editing paradigm
 integrated, 9 pin machine control
 integrated digital restoration tools
 multitasking DSP
 integrated “desktop” CD preparation
 the PreMaster CD delivery format
 ultra–high speed data network with multiuser, file–level read/write (Anderson 1993)
 96 kHz & 192 kHz, single and double wire AES I/O support
 double precision internal signal processing (Moorer 1999)
 integrated DVD-Audio & SACD production (Moorer 1998)

References

Notations
 Moorer, James A; (1982). The Audio Signal Processor: The Next Step in Digital Audio. New York: Audio Engineering Society. Preprint Number: Rye-020
 Moorer, James A.; Borish, Jeffrey; Snell, John; (1985). A Gate-Array Multiplier for Digital Audio Processing. New York: Audio Engineering Society. Preprint Number: 2243
 Moorer, James A.; Borish, Jeffrey; (1986). An Optical Disk Recording, Archiving, and Editing Device for Digital Audio Signal Processing. New York: Audio Engineering Society. Preprint Number: 2376
 Lawrence M. Fisher; (1988). Removing the Static From Old Recordings. The New York Times
 Cumming, David P.; Moorer, James A.; Ogawa, H.; Ishiguro, T.; Nakajima, Hisashi; (1990). CD Mastering Using a Recordable -Red Book Standard- CD and Graphical PQ Subcode Editing. New York: Audio Engineering Society. Preprint Number: 3006
 Reichbach, Jonathan D.; Kemmerer, Richard A.; (1992). SoundWorks: An Object-Oriented Distributed System for Digital Sound. New York: IEEE. 0018-9162/92/0300-0025
 
 Moorer, James A; (1996). Breaking the Sound Barrier: Mastering at 96 kHz and Beyond. New York: Audio Engineering Society. Preprint Number: 4357
 TECnology Hall of Fame; (1997). 1997 TEC Awards. Penton Media Inc. Mix Magazine
 
 
 Jacobson, Linda; (2004). Silicon Audio. Penton Media Inc. Mix Magazine
 
 TECnology Hall of Fame; (2006). 1987 Sonic Solutions NoNoise. Penton Media Inc. Mix Magazine

External links 
 Web site
 Resume of Dr. J.A. Moorer

Electronics companies of the United States